Bidjara or Pitjara or Bidyara may refer to:

 Bidjara (Warrego River), also spelt Pitjara, an Aboriginal people of eastern Queensland 
 Bidjara language 
 Bidjara (Bulloo River), also spelt Bitjara and Bithara, an Aboriginal people of south-western Queensland 
 Bidjara language (Ngura)

See also
Badjiri, also spelt Budjari, an Aboriginal people of southern Queensland, close to the Paroo River and the southern border
Badjiri language

Language and nationality disambiguation pages